Ennerdale and Kinniside is a civil parish in Copeland, Cumbria, England. At the 2011 census it had a population of 220.

The village of Ennerdale Bridge is in the west of the parish; much of the parish forms Ennerdale valley, holding Ennerdale Water, the most westerly of the lakes of the Lake District.

The Anglican parish church of St Mary, Ennerdale is in Ennerdale Bridge village.

Ennerdale and Kinniside C of E Primary School is in Ennerdale Bridge village.

There is a parish council, the lowest tier of local government.

Listed buildings

 there are four listed buildings in the parish, all at grade II.

References

External links
Cumbria County History Trust: Ennerdale and Kinniside (nb: provisional research only – see Talk page)

Civil parishes in Cumbria
Borough of Copeland